Jayaraman Sivaguru (Siva) is the Antonia and Marshall Wilson Professor of Chemistry and the Associate Director, Center for Photochemical Sciences at the Department of Chemistry, Bowling Green State University, Bowling Green, Ohio. He is a recipient of 2008 National Science Foundation CAREER Award, 2010 Grammaticakis-Neumann Prize from the Swiss Chemical Society, 2011 young-investigator award from the Inter-American Photochemical Society (I-APS), and 2012-young investigator award from Sigma Xi. His honors also include Excellence in Research award, 2011 Excellence in Teaching award, and the 2012 PeltierAward for Innovation in Teaching. Prof. Siaguru was a visiting young professor at the Global Centre for Excellence at Osaka University, Japan and was a visiting fellow for the Chinese Academy of Sciences President's International Fellowship Initiative in 2018. He is an editor for the Journal of Photochemistry and Photobiology A: Chemistry and from 2020 serves as the co-Editor-in-Chief of  Journal of Photochemistry and Photobiology published by Elsevier. He is an international board member of the International Union of Pure and Applied Chemistry (IUPAC) photochemistry symposium.

Prof. Jayaraman Sivaguru is known for developing an array of new photoreactions - Aza Paternò-Büchi reaction, photo-ene reaction and transposed Paternò-Büchi reaction. He was one of the first researchers to utilize restricted bond rotations in the excited state to control asymmetric photoreactions - conceptually known as Atropselective phototoreactions. His research group  showed that atropisomeric thioureas can be utilized as organophotocatalysts for enantioselective photochemical reactions and developed a mechanistic model for the observed chiral induction. His group also developed Supramolecular Photocatalysis based on Cucurbitruil nano-containers. His research work led  the use of light to degrade polymers from bio-resources and recover the degraded products to resynthesize the polymer making a sustainable and recyclable polymer.

References 

Bowling Green State University faculty
Living people
Year of birth missing (living people)